Toys-to-life is a video game feature using physical figurines or action figures to interact within the game. These toys use a near field communication (NFC), radio frequency identification (RFID), or image recognition data protocol to determine the individual figurine's proximity, and save a player's progress data to a storage medium located within that piece. It was one of the most lucrative branches of the video game industry, with the Skylanders franchise alone selling more than $3 billion worth over the course of four years.

Although modern versions use NFC technology, the earliest example of such a game is Redbeard's Pirate Quest: Interactive Toy created by Zowie in 1999. This PC game came with a plastic pirate ship that connects to the printer port, and players can interact with the game by placing the separate pirate figurines on various places in the ship, and moving or rotating them. Other precursors to these kinds of games include the Captain Power and the Soldiers of the Future, Dennō Bōkenki Webdiver and Daigunder toylines, where kids could plug Gladion and Daigunder into their TV screens to use as controls, and the other toys could interact with the game through infrared sensors. Toys-to-life games generally use a third-person camera view, and have in-game power-up figurines. Toys-to-life games generally have an accompanying portal device that is used to "transport" the figurine's character and associated player data into the game. The figurines can be transferred from each game in the franchise, possibly resetting with every different installment.

Pre-NFC interactive game toys

Captain Power and the Soldiers of the Future (1987)
Based on the TV series, a light gun type games with a VHS tape and a space ship toy that interacts with TV through infrared.

Redbeard's Pirate Quest: Interactive Toy (1999)
This PC game came with a plastic pirate ship that connects to the printer port, and players can interact with the game by placing the separate pirate figurines on various places in the ship, and moving or rotating them.

Ellie's Enchanted Garden (2002)
A PC game came with a plastic castle courtyard garden that connects to a USB port, players can interact with the PC game by placing figurines of a girl and several animals on various places, play skip rope, slide figurines from castle to forest to change the in-game environment.

Easy-Link Internet Launchpad (2007)
A Fisher-Price brand toy that connects to USB, figurines from Sesame Street and various kids shows can be placed to play games on their accompanying websites.

Mattel HyperScan
Another predecessor to Toys-to-life is Mattel's short-lived 2006 game console the HyperScan. It focused on the same concept that Toy-to-life products implemented, but instead of using figurines opted to use collectible trading cards instead. Due to poor sales and reception, only 5 games were produced.

Ongoing

Amiibo (2014–present)

Amiibo (2014) is a toys-to-life platform primarily based on Nintendo properties and characters, as well some non-Nintendo franchises like third-party Super Smash Bros. fighters, Shovel Knight, and Mega Man. Launching in 2014 with figurines, Nintendo has since also deployed Amiibo-compatible playing cards, plush yarn toys, and even promotional cereal boxes. Unlike most other toys-to-life series, Amiibo does not have games dedicated exclusively to the use of the toys, but the characters are used throughout various games on Nintendo Wii U, 3DS, and Switch consoles. Amiibo can save players' progress data and information per game, however many games only offer read-only functionality.

Beyblade Burst (2016-present) 

Beyblade Burst is a multimedia franchise created by Takara Tomy and Hasbro. These are mostly toys but Hasbro's version has QR codes on the back. The Beyblade Burst app uses image recognition to transfer the toys into the video games.

Lightseekers: Awakening (2017–present)
Lightseekers: Awakening is a multimedia franchise created by PlayFusion, an independent British studio co-founded by Mark Gerhard, the former CEO of RuneScape publisher Jagex. Its early development was partly financed via a Kickstarter crowdfunding campaign, which had raised $227,660 by November 2016.
The Lightseekers brand consists of a toys-to-life role-playing video game (commonly referred to as Lightseekers RPG) and a trading card game. The toys-to-life video game was released for iOS and Android mobile platforms in May 2017.
The Lightseekers RPG video game is free-to-play and does not require accessories to function, but players can purchase a line of interactive figures made in partnership with Tomy to enhance their experience.
Figures can be decked with various accessories which modify the corresponding character's in-game appearance and abilities. They also incorporate a speaker for various one-liners, and a motion sensor allowing them to be used as a controller during flying segments.
A second Lightseekers video game was released in January 2019 for the Nintendo Switch, but it is a virtual adaptation of the trading card game rather than a port of the toys-to-life RPG.

Discontinued

Skylanders (2011–2016)

Skylanders (2011) is one of the most successful early games of this genre. Since its first release, each year had seen a new installment in the series, totaling six . Each game has its own portal device and a different take on the premise than past games. They star the Skylander heroes and the evil antagonist Kaos. All current figurines are compatible with its most recent installment, Skylanders: Imaginators (2016). While new games were since published, it has not seen a new main console release that would follow the "toys to life" genre since then, due to Activision’s desire to take an extended break  from the main series. A mobile RPG spin-off, Skylanders: Ring of Heroes, was released worldwide in December 12, 2018, developed by Com2Us. Ring of Heroes was revamped in December 2020; services for the game were terminated in early 2022. Following their announced acquisition of Activision Blizzard, Microsoft has expressed interest in continuing the Skylanders series. Other than that, there is no official information about continuation of the "toys to life" aspect of the franchise.

U.B. Funkeys (2007–2010)

U.B. Funkeys (2007) was the first game of this genre. It was discontinued in 2010 and was worked on by Mattel, Arkadium, and Radica. It had multiple updates before it was discontinued. Almost every update had a portal, also referred to as a 'Hub', with the same mold but a different pattern. The Hubs were a special USB port to plug into the user's computer. The characters were the Funkeys, which each unlocked new in-game areas.

F.A.M.P.S. (2009-2011) 
F.A.M.P.S. was the second game ever made in the toys-to-life genre. It was made by Girl Tech and produced by Mattel (the same people who produced U.B. Funkeys). It was less like a traditional game and more like an application giving players customization options for their desktop and a safe social network to talk on. Each figure unlocked new mini games and customization options. Due to the game only being available for download online no known copies of the game still exist, making F.A.M.P.S. lost media.

Pokémon Rumble U (2013) 

Pokémon Rumble U was Nintendo's first foray into the toys-to-life genre, released in 2013 for the Wii U. It is the first game that utilized the built-in NFC reader on the Wii U gamepad. In the game, players control Pokémon and engage in battle with other Pokémon. When figures are scanned with the NFC reader, they can be utilized in-game. In addition, if anything else with NFC technology is scanned into the game, the player will receive a random effect.

Disney Infinity (2013–2016)

Disney Infinity (2013) was a toys-to-life series based on Disney characters and franchises. Since the initial game's release in 2013, there had been three installments. Disney Infinity was the first game, focusing on Disney and Pixar characters. In 2014, Disney Infinity: Marvel Super Heroes was released as the second game, which focused on Marvel characters and properties. The third game, 2015's Disney Infinity 3.0, centered on the Star Wars franchise. All Disney Infinity figurines could interact with various games in the series. The line concluded in 2016, when Disney announced that production of the series had officially ceased, and that there would be no more future titles.

Telepods (2013-2015)
These figurines were used in Angry Birds mobile apps such as Angry Birds Star Wars II and Angry Birds Go!. They were used by putting the included stand onto your devices camera and putting the figure onto the stand. The QR code below the figure would get scanned and the figure would "teleport" to the app as an unlockable or costume.

Disney Playmation (2015–2016)

Disney Playmation was a longer range (~10m) networked interactive role-playing game with wearable toys that supported BLE communications with phone apps. The product was sold in collaboration with Hasbro. The single-product story line delivered was based on the Marvel Iron Man universe. Other universes were announced before the product was terminated including Star Wars and Frozen.

Hero Plug and Play (2015–2016)
A toys-to-life game made by Jakks Pacific. It was a console connected to a portal connected to plugs which the player connect to their TV. They placed the figures on the portal and they went to the player's game. It was short-lived. Due to poor sales, there were three themes released: DC Super Heroes, Teenage Mutant Ninja Turtles, and Power Rangers.

Sick Bricks (2015-2020)

A game by Spin Master with Lego-compatible figurines and builds. When players used their smartphones or tablets to scan their physical figurines, a digital representation of these figurines appeared in the game. The game took place in a small town called Sick City, which was under fire by a villain named Omega Overlord. Various heroes fought against him, and his goons would combine with each other to fight them off. There were various multi-packs and special blind bags containing the toys. While the game itself was free, the additional figures would cost money. There were only three waves of figures, all of which were released in 2015.  Following the third wave's release, no additional information about the series was released, so it was assumed to be discontinued. The line was based on a 2015 cartoon series of the same.

Lego Dimensions (2015–2017)

Lego Dimensions (2015) was a toys-to-life game that used physical Lego figures, featuring characters from various Warner Brothers and Lego franchises and other third-party intellectual properties such as Back to the Future and Sonic the Hedgehog. Players must physically assemble some figurines by unlocking the levels in-game, which showed them the building instructions on-screen. Almost all of the figurines, and the base portal, have to be built by the player. No sequels were released, with the base game supporting all available figures. On October 23, 2017, Warner Bros. officially announced that they would not be developing further content for Lego Dimensions.

Starlink: Battle for Atlas (2018–2019)

Starlink: Battle for Atlas (2018) is Ubisoft's first step into the toys-to-life video game genre. The game doesn't require the use of the toys to be played, but the gameplay is enriched by using them. The interactive toys consist of three categories: ships (which consist of a body and two wings), weapons, and pilots. Pilots and ships are attached to controller mounts, which load the attached toy into the game instantly. Each loadout requires a pilot and ship body, but ship wings and weapons can be dynamically mixed, matched, and stacked using attachments on the ship bodies and wings. The game was developed by Ubisoft Toronto and released on October 16, 2018, for the PlayStation 4, Xbox One, and Nintendo Switch. The Switch version features an exclusive pilot and ship (Nintendo's Fox McCloud and his Arwing) within the game's starter pack. An all-digital edition was also released for all three consoles that contain most of the released physical toys in-game.

On April 3, 2019, it was announced that due to sales that fell below expectations, there would be no further releases of physical Starlink toys. Digital expansions, however, would continue to be released. In total, 8 ships, 16 weapons, and 11 pilots were released physically across 3 starter packs, 6 ship packs, 4 weapon packs, and 5 pilot packs. Controller mount packs were also released for each console that enabled co-op play with the physical toys.

Related
 R.O.B. - an accessory for the Nintendo Entertainment System released in 1985 that involved a real-world toy reacting and interacting with in-game software.
 Augmented reality - genre of games and other experiences involving the blending of physical and digital mediums, but through the use of cameras and real-world image manipulation.
 Rhythm game - music-themed genre of video games that often utilize highly specialized controllers and other physical accessories in coordination with software to simulate the experience of interacting with music.
 Exergaming - exercise-themed genre of video games that often utilize specialized controllers and other physical accessories in coordination with software to provide a form of exercise for the user.
 Light gun - video game accessories that imitate the physical use of a gun in coordination with software.
 Racing wheel - video game accessories that imitate the physical use of a steering wheel in coordination with software.

References

External links
 Toys-to-life: what's coming next

User interface techniques
Video game gameplay
Video game accessories
 
Sentient toys in fiction